Bonne Fin is a village in the Cavaellon commune in the Aquin Arrondissement, in the Sud department of Haiti.

References

Populated places in Sud (department)